Thomas Peter DiNapoli (born February 10, 1954) is an American politician serving as the 54th and current New York State Comptroller since 2007. A member of the Democratic Party, he was appointed by a bipartisan majority of the New York State Legislature to the position of comptroller on February 7, 2007. He was then elected Comptroller by New York's voters in 2010, 2014, 2018 and 2022. In his 2014 victory, he led the statewide ticket with the most votes. He was easily reelected to a third term in November 2018, receiving 64.9% of the vote. In 2022, he secured his fourth term in office, receiving 57% of the vote. He is the second longest-serving comptroller in New York State History.

DiNapoli previously served as a New York State Assemblyman for the 16th district in northwestern Nassau County, first elected in 1986. He served 20 years in the Assembly. During his tenure, he chaired the Environmental Conservation Committee, the Local Governments Committee, and the Governmental Operations Committee.

He is a resident of the village of Great Neck Plaza, New York.

Early life and education
DiNapoli was born to Nicholas Peter DiNapoli and Adeline (Abbondandelo) DiNapoli, named after his paternal grandfather Thomas Peter DiNapoli. DiNapoli, raised in Albertson, has been active in politics since he was a teenager, when he ran for and won a position as a trustee on the Mineola Board of Education. At the age of 18 in 1972, he was the youngest person in New York State history elected to public office. He served on the school board for 10 years.

In 1976, DiNapoli graduated magna cum laude from Hofstra University with a bachelor's degree in history. After college he worked for New York Telephone and AT&T. In 1988, he received a master's degree in human resources management from The New School University's Graduate School of Management and Urban Professions.

New York Assembly and politics

DiNapoli worked as an aide for Assemblyman Angelo F. Orazio. He also served as a District Representative for Congressman Robert J. Mrazek. DiNapoli was a member of the New York State Assembly from 1987 to 2007, sitting in the 187th, 188th, 189th, 190th, 191st, 192nd, 193rd, 194th, 195th, 196th and 197th New York State Legislatures. He represented the 16th District, located in Northwest Nassau County. DiNapoli was later also elected as Chairman of the Nassau County Democratic Committee. In 2001, he lost the Democratic nomination for Nassau County Executive to Thomas Suozzi, who later won the election. In 2006, DiNapoli was a candidate for lieutenant governor, but dropped out of the race after Attorney General Eliot Spitzer, the party's frontrunner for governor, chose Senate Minority Leader David Paterson as his running mate.

State Comptroller

Appointment

Alan Hevesi resigned in disgrace in December 2006. On February 7, 2007, in a joint session of the New York State Legislature, DiNapoli was elected as New York State Comptroller in a vote of 150-56.

Service as Comptroller
In lieu of a transition committee, DiNapoli established a commission to review the Comptroller's office. The commission was headed by former Mayor of New York Ed Koch and financial expert Frank Zarb. Also included in this commission were Nassau County Executive Tom Suozzi, Chancellor of Syracuse University Nancy Cantor, and New York City Comptroller William Thompson. In March 2007, as one of DiNapoli's first public statements as Comptroller, he warned Governor Eliot Spitzer that his proposed budget had levels of spending were at an "unsustainable rate". DiNapoli stated that, at the rate proposed by Spitzer's budget, there would be a $13 billion deficit in three years' time.

As Comptroller, DiNapoli makes periodic, public reports on a variety of issues affecting state, local, and charitable agencies. In March 2010, he reported that non-profits had been hurt by the recession as well as by delays in state contracts. The following month, he gained a reputation as a critic of the State's budget deficit. He "has proposed major reforms in the state budget process". He unveiled a package of proposed reforms to the budget process in March 2010. Key parts of his plans are for "governors to identify plans to erase budget deficits in future years", to cap state debt, and to require excess surplusses to be deposited into the "rainy day fund".

2010 election

DiNapoli ran for election in November 2010. On May 1, 2010, he won the Democratic Rural Conference's Straw Poll by acclamation. On May 26, 2010, DiNapoli received the designation of the New York Democratic Party. "I'm grateful for your support and I salute your commitment to moving our great state forward. It's a commitment I share with each of you," said DiNapoli on the occasion. He received the nomination of the Working Families Party for comptroller.

In November 2010, he narrowly won reelection. DiNapoli claimed victory early the morning of November 3, and Harry Wilson conceded later in the morning.

2014 election

DiNapoli ran for reelection in November 2014. On May 21, 2014, he received the nomination of the New York Democratic Party. "This office has an important compelling and independent role to play in moving our state forward. As New York State Comptroller, I'll continue to go to work every day striving to do right by New Yorkers," said DiNapoli at the Democratic Convention. He also received the nomination of the Independence, Working Families and Women's Equality parties for State Comptroller.

In November 2014, he won reelection, defeating Republican candidate Bob Antonacci. DiNapoli received the most votes of any statewide candidate with 2,077,293 votes.

2018 election

DiNapoli ran for reelection for a third full term. On May 23, 2018, he received the nomination of the New York Democratic Party. "This office has a lot more work to do for a safer, fairer New York. As New York State Comptroller, I'll continue to go to work every day striving to do right by New Yorkers," said DiNapoli at the Democratic Convention. He also received the nomination of the Independence, Working Families and Women's Equality and Reform parties for State Comptroller.

In November 2018, he won reelection, defeating Republican candidate Jonathan Trichter, a former Democrat who switched to the GOP. DiNapoli once again received the most votes of any statewide candidate with 4,027,886 votes.

2022 election

DiNapoli won reelection to a fourth term. He ran unopposed in the primary.

Personal
DiNapoli is single and has no children. He lives in Great Neck Plaza, New York.

Both of his parents are the children of immigrants. His father, Nick, served in World War II, and after the war worked as a cable splicer for New York Telephone. For a time he was a shop steward for his union, the Communications Workers of America. DiNapoli's mother, Adeline, was a records clerk for the county police department. On September 1, 2013, he received the honorary citizenship in the small town of Paduli, in the province of Benevento - Italy, the birthplace of his paternal grandfather. He has been awarded an honorary degree from Hofstra University and Ulster University.

Electoral history 

*DiNapoli also appeared on the Independence Party and Liberal Party lines; Zampino also appeared on the Conservative Party line.

*DiNapoli also appeared on the Independence Party, Liberal Party, and Working Families Party lines; Galluscio also appeared on the Conservative Party and Right to Life Party lines.

*DiNapoli also appeared on the Independence Party, Liberal Party, and Working Families Party lines.

*DiNapoli also appeared on the Independence Party, Liberal Party, and Working Families Party lines; McGillicuddy also appeared on the Conservative Party line.

*DiNapoli also appeared on the Working Families Party line; Wilson also appeared on the Independence Party and Conservative Party lines.

*DiNapoli also appeared on the Working Families Party, Independence Party, and Women's Equality Party lines; Antonacci also appeared on the Conservative Party and Stop Common Core Party lines.

*DiNapoli also appeared on the Working Families Party, Independence Party, Women's Equality Party, and Reform Party lines; Trichter also appeared on the Conservative Party line.

*DiNapoli also appeared on the Working Families Party line; Rodriguez also appeared on the Conservative Party line.

References

Further reading
Letter Written To The New York Times In Response To An Article About New York's Small, Freshwater Wetlands
"Instant reformer: Face to Face with Thomas P. DiNapoli," (Pensions & Investments)
Paterson, David Black, Blind, & In Charge: A Story of Visionary Leadership and Overcoming Adversity. New York, New York, 2020

External links

New York State Office of the State Comptroller government website
DiNapoli 2022 campaign website

The New York Times - Times Topics: Thomas P. DiNapoli collected news stories and commentary

|-

1954 births
21st-century American politicians
American people of Italian descent
Hofstra University alumni
Living people
Democratic Party members of the New York State Assembly
Politicians from Nassau County, New York
New York State Comptrollers
People from Rockville Centre, New York
People from Great Neck, New York
School board members in New York (state)
2008 United States presidential electors
2012 United States presidential electors
2016 United States presidential electors
2020 United States presidential electors